Ewart Scott Grogan (1874–1967) was an English explorer, politician, and entrepreneur.  He was the first person in recorded history to walk the length of Africa, from Cape Town to Cairo.

Biography

Ewart Grogan was educated at Winchester College and Jesus College, Cambridge, which he left without taking a degree. He was expelled from both school and university. He subsequently spent some time at the Slade School of Art before going to Bulawayo to help defend the town in the Second Matabele War.

He fell in love with Gertrude Watt, the sister of a Cambridge classmate, but her stepfather disapproved of the match; while Grogan came from a respectable family, his own life had little to recommend it.  He proposed becoming the first man to make the Cape-to-Cairo journey; the stepfather agreed that this would be a suitable test of his character and seriousness.

He then commenced his expedition from Cape Town to Cairo at the age of 24, reaching Cairo in 1900, after two and a half years of travelling. He had been stalked by lions, hippos, and crocodiles, pursued by headhunters and cannibals, plagued by parasites and fevers.  He returned home a popular sensation.  He was made a fellow of the Royal Geographical Society and met Queen Victoria.  In four months of effort, Grogan wrote about his journey in From the Cape to Cairo; the First Traverse of Africa from South to North (1902).  Capping his success, he married Gertrude at Christ Church, Lancaster Gate, Paddington, London on 11 October 1900.

Gertrude's Garden Children's Hospital located in Nairobi, Kenya was founded in 1947, with the donation of some land by Colonel Ewart Grogan, in memory of his wife, Gertrude Edith. The hospital now has seven branches spread out in the city's residential areas.

While at Cambridge Grogan was a member of the notorious and mysterious dining society, The Natives, a club which has run for over 135 years.

First World War
In October 1914 Grogan traversed part of German East Africa to Kivu where he met his old friend the Belgian . Most of his subsequent life was spent in east Africa, mainly Kenya, where he settled. He died in South Africa at the age of 92.

Kenya
Ewart Grogan and his wife Gertrude arrived in Kenya in 1904; making their way inland from Mombasa to Nairobi, Grogan swiftly became a leading figure in the Kenyan settler community and a key player in the economic development of the country. He initially made a number of real estate purchases including the Cross estate and the Manse estate, on which he built his famous house Chiromo. Grogan then began to look for further business opportunities including the potential of developing commercial logging near the Mau summit and for cattle grazing on the Uasin Gishu plateau. In 1907 Grogan was involved in what became publicly known as the "Nairobi Incident" after his sister Dorothy and her friend alleged to have been shamefully treated by three Kikuyu rickshaw drivers, Grogan took it upon himself to punish the men by walking them into Nairobi and publicly flogging them, Grogan flogged the first man, the two others being flogged by other members of the settler community, amongst them William Bowker. The event was widely reported around the world often erroneously reporting that one of the Kikuyu men had been killed. In response to this disregard for colonial authority Grogan and the two other men were tried and convicted; Grogan was sentenced to one month's prison and a Rs 500 fine.

Grogan continued to expand his business interests in Kenya both before and after the First World War, as well as completing the railway line to his logging concession. He subsequently sunk a large portion of his wealth into building the first deep water harbour in Mombasa.

He later built the Torr's Hotel in Nairobi and was a proprietor with Lord Delamere of the East African Standard newspaper. After World War I, Grogan had built significant business interests in Kenya including a ranch at Longonot, the Equator Saw mill, a rice mill and factory in Mwanza, land at Turi, a ranch on the Athi plains and a Kingatori coffee farm. These assets were sold to finance his next project the development of land in Taveta in southern Kenya, where he now spent most of his time. He invested a fortune to successfully irrigate and develop arid scrub into fertile productive land.

On the outbreak of the Second World War Grogan, who was now aged in his sixties, immediately reported to Nairobi to General Dickinson. He was appointed Belgian liaison officer and carried out reconnaissance across the Congolese border. Later in the war he was promoted to Lieutenant-Colonel and put in charge of three prisoner of war camps in Gilgil and Nairobi. After the war Grogan returned to Taveta, living in Grogan's Castle, the large house he built on a hill overlooking the area. In 1943 Gertrude Grogan died from a heart attack in Nairobi. Grogan, seeking a fitting memorial for his wife, founded the Gertrude's Garden Children's Hospital of which there are now seven in present-day Nairobi.

Grogan was involved in politics all his life in Kenya, serving on the Colonial Association and the legislative council. Grogan took an interest in the advancement and education of the indigenous African population, believing that 'the road of advancement must be open to all Africans' and only then could his vision of a 'reasonable and decent society in Africa' be fulfilled. Grogan had intended his Jipe Estate to be used as an agricultural college for Africans, offering it to the colonial government but never receiving a reply. Grogan kept abreast of politics in the colony during the struggle for independence, lunching on several occasions with Tom Mboya at the Torrs Hotel and proclaiming him a 'very remarkable young African'. Grogan served on the Legislative Council throughout Kenya's move to independence. In his later years Grogan lived with companion Camilla Towers at his house in Taveta, Kenya, until his death in South Africa at the age of 92.

Legacy
In 2007, American journalist Julian Smith retraced Grogan's route from South Africa to southern Sudan, and wrote about it in the book Crossing the Heart of Africa (2010). The book also re-tells Grogan's journey and life story.

Works

References

Bibliography

External links

 
 

English explorers
People educated at Winchester College
People of the Second Matabele War
Alumni of Jesus College, Cambridge
Settlers of Kenya
Members of the Legislative Council of Kenya
1967 deaths
Royal Munster Fusiliers officers
Companions of the Distinguished Service Order
British Army personnel of World War I
1874 births
Fellows of the Royal Geographical Society
Liberal Unionist Party parliamentary candidates